St Mary's Church is in Warrington Road, Lower Ince, Ince-in-Makerfield, Wigan, Greater Manchester, England.  It is an active Anglican parish church in the deanery of Wigan, the archdeaconry of Warrington, and the diocese of Liverpool.

Old church

The previous church was built in 1887, and designed by the Lancaster architects Paley, Austin and Paley.  Two local industrialists donated £5,000 each to its cost.  The church was built in red brick, and was distinguished by having a bellcote at the east end by a tall, slender spirelet.  It was also unusual in that it had narrow aisles, forming passages down the sides of the church.  The church was built on a coalfield, and subsequently suffered damage from subsidence, which led to its demolition in 1978.  Pollard and Pevsner in the Buildings of England series describe it as having been a "grand" church.  Brandwood et al state that the practice designed a number of urban churches around this time, and they consider that this was the most important, with "real character and individuality".

Present church

The new church was converted from a school built in the 1870s.  It contains some stained glass dating from about 1889 and from 1923, which was moved from the old church and re-set in the present church.

See also

List of works by Paley, Austin and Paley

References
Citations

Sources

External links
Photographs of the old church before and during its demolition

Church of England church buildings in Greater Manchester
Anglican Diocese of Liverpool
Gothic Revival church buildings in England
Gothic Revival architecture in Greater Manchester
Paley, Austin and Paley buildings